During the 1996–97 English football season, Charlton Athletic F.C. competed in the Football League First Division.

Season summary
After missing out on promotion to the Premier League the season before in the play-offs, Alan Curbishley was looking to steer Charlton to automatic promotion the following season but it turned out to be a disappointing season for the Addicks, finishing in 15th place.

Final league table

Results
Charlton Athletic's score comes first

Legend

Football League First Division

FA Cup

League Cup

First-team squad
Squad at end of season

Notes

References

Charlton Athletic F.C. seasons
Charlton Athletic